Deborah N. Archer is an American civil rights lawyer and law professor. She is the Jacob K. Javits Professor at New York University and professor of clinical law at New York University School of Law. She also directs the Center on Race, Inequality, and the Law and the Civil Rights Clinic at NYU School of Law. In January 2021, she was elected president of the American Civil Liberties Union, becoming the first African American to hold the position in the organization’s history.

Early life and education
The daughter of immigrants from Jamaica, Archer was raised in Windsor, Connecticut. She earned a Bachelor of Arts degree in government from Smith College in 1993 and a Juris Doctor from Yale Law School in 1996. At Yale, she won the Charles G. Albom Prize.

Career
After graduating from Yale, Archer clerked for Judge Alvin Thompson of the United States District Court for the District of Connecticut, and the following year (1997 to 1998) was a Marvin M. Karpatkin legal fellow at the ACLU. Archer was assistant counsel at the NAACP Legal Defense and Educational Fund from 1998 to 2000, and then an associate at the law firm Simpson Thacher & Bartlett from 2000 to 2003.

In 2003, Archer joined the faculty of New York Law School (NYLS), where she was the first dean of diversity and inclusion and chief diversity officer, and associate dean for academic affairs and student engagement. She led the school’s Racial Justice Project and the Impact Center for Public Interest Law, which she co-founded.

Since 2009, she has been on the ACLU’s board, and since 2017 has been general counsel and a member of the board’s executive committee. She is also a member of the boards of the New York Civil Liberties Union, the Legal Aid Society, and the National Center for Law and Economic Justice. In 2016 and again in 2017, Archer served as acting chair of the New York City Civilian Complaint Review Board, the body that investigates allegations of police misconduct.

After 15 years at NYLS, Archer moved to New York University in July 2018. Archer is Jacob K. Javits Professor and Professor of Clinical Law, Co-Faculty Director of the Center on Race, Inequality, and the Law, and director of the Civil Rights Clinic at New York University School of Law.

ACLU president
On January 30, 2021, a remote meeting of the ACLU board elected Archer president of the organization, making her the first African American to hold the position in the organization’s 101-year history. As its eighth president, she chairs the board of directors, setting the direction the organization takes in civil litigation policies. Archer succeeded Susan N. Herman, a professor at Brooklyn Law School and ACLU president since 2008, who oversaw a period of growth with increased donations following the election of President Donald Trump and extensive litigation during his administration. In a statement on Archer’s election, Romero said that civil rights and racial justice were top priorities for the organization moving forward and noted Archer’s expertise in these fields.

Honors

In 2016, Archer was honored by the New York Law Journal which cited her as one of its Top Women in Law.

In 2021, the Law and Society Association awarded Archer the John Hope Franklin Prize, Honorable Mention for her article "'White Men's Roads Through Black Men's Homes': Advancing Racial Equity Through Highway Reconstruction", which appeared in the Vanderbilt Law Review. She also received the 2021 Stephen Ellmann Memorial Clinical Scholarship Award from the American Association of Law Schools, and the Haywood Burns/Shanara Guilbert Award from the Northeast People of Color Legal Scholarship Conference.

Personal life
Archer is married to Richard Buery, a former deputy mayor of New York City. They live in Brooklyn with their two sons.

Selected works

 Archer, Deborah N. (2020). “‘White Men’s Roads Through Black Men’s Homes’: Advancing Racial Equity Through Highway Reconstruction”. Vanderbilt Law Review. 73: 1259.
Archer, Deborah N. (2019–20). “Exile From Main Street”. Harvard Civil Rights-Civil Liberties Law Review. 55: 788.
Archer, Deborah N. (2019). The New Housing Segregation: The Jim Crow Effects of Crime-Free Housing Ordinances. Michigan Law Review. 118: 173.

References

External links
 “Where Do We Go From Here?: A Conversation About the Future of Race and Inequality in America” – discussion with Anthony Thompson at NYU Law’s Center on Race, Inequality, and the Law, September 25, 2020

Year of birth missing (living people)
Living people
American people of Jamaican descent
American women lawyers
New York Law School faculty
New York University faculty
New York University School of Law faculty
People from Windsor, Connecticut
Presidents of the American Civil Liberties Union
Smith College alumni
Yale Law School alumni
21st-century American women